Amsacta grammiphlebia is a moth of the family Erebidae. It was described by George Hampson in 1901. It is found in the Democratic Republic of the Congo, Malawi, Zambia and Zimbabwe.

References

Moths described in 1901
Spilosomina
Lepidoptera of the Democratic Republic of the Congo
Lepidoptera of Malawi
Lepidoptera of Zambia
Lepidoptera of Zimbabwe
Moths of Sub-Saharan Africa